Sunny is a musical with music by Jerome Kern and a libretto by Oscar Hammerstein II and Otto Harbach. The plot involves Sunny, the star of a circus act, who falls for a rich playboy but comes in conflict with his snooty family. This show was the follow-up to the 1920 hit musical Sally, both starring Marilyn Miller in the title roles, and it was Kern's first musical together with Hammerstein. Sunny also became a hit, with its original Broadway production in 1925 running for 517 performances. The London production starred Binnie Hale.

Productions

The musical premiered on Broadway at the New Amsterdam Theatre on September 22, 1925. The musical was produced by Charles Dillingham and directed by Hassard Short, with scenic and costume design by James Reynolds. The cast included Marilyn Miller as Sunny, Jack Donahue as Jim Deering, Clifton Webb as Harold Harcourt Wendell-Wendell, Mary Hay as "Weenie" Winters, Joseph Cawthorn, Paul Frawley as Tom Warren, Cliff Edwards, Pert KeMoss & Fontana, Esther Howard as Sue Warren, Dorothy Francis, and the George Olsen Orchestra. Dances for Marilyn Miller were staged by Fred Astaire. The musical closed on December 11, 1926 after 517 performances.

The musical was produced in London at the London Hippodrome starting in October 1926. The musical starred Binnie Hale as Sunny and Jack Buchanan as Jim Deming. Buchanan was also the choreographer, with direction by Charles Mast.

The musical comedy opened at the Empire Theatre, Sydney, Australia, in March 1927. It was produced by Ernest C. Rolls and starred the British performers Fred Bluett, Wyn Richmond and Queenie Ashton and American Beatrice Kay.

Musical numbers

Note: The song list below is from the most common version of the show currently performed and excludes all specialties, cut numbers, and those added for other major productions.
Act I

 "Opening Act I", "Ballyhoo", and "Here We Are Together Again" - Ballyhoo and Ensemble
 "Sunny" - Tom and Boys
 "Entrance of Sunny" - Ensemble
 "Who?" - Tom and Sunny
 "So's Your Old Man" - Harold and the Eight Girls
 "Let's Say Good Night Till It's Morning" - Jim and Weenie
 "Pas de Equestrienne" - Sunny
 "D'Ye Love Me?" - Sunny
 "The Wedding Knell" - Sunny and Boys
 "Two Little Bluebirds" - Harold and Weenie
 "Finale Act One" - Company

Act II

 "Opening Act Two" - Ensemble
 "When We Get Our Divorce" - Jim and Sunny
 "Sunshine" - Marcia
 "Who? (reprise)" - Tom and Sunny
 "Who? Dance" - Sunny, Jim, Harold, Weenie and Ensemble
 "Remember Me" - Tom and Sunny
 "The Chase" - Orchestra
 "The Hunt Dance" - Sunny
 "Finale Ultimo" - Sunny and Company

Films

The musical was adapted for a 1930 film version directed by William A. Seiter and featuring additional music by Kern.

In 1941, a second film version was produced, directed by Herbert Wilcox. The first film starred Marilyn Miller, the second one (with a highly revised plot) starred Anna Neagle, with Ray Bolger in his first film role after playing the Scarecrow in The Wizard of Oz (1939).

Recreation of scenes in film

In Sally of the Scandals (1928), the main character is in a musical production that was filmed using the chorus and sets from a production of Sunny at the Mayan Theater in Los Angeles.

In the film Till the Clouds Roll By (1946), a fictionalized biography of composer Jerome Kern, two songs from the show are performed by Judy Garland as Marilyn Miller, representing a performance from "Sunny". They are "Sunny" and "Who?"

References

External links

1925 musicals
Musicals by Jerome Kern
Musicals set in the Roaring Twenties
Original musicals
Broadway musicals
Musicals by Oscar Hammerstein II
Musicals by Otto Harbach